Theodor Fischer (28 May 1862 – 25 December 1938) was a German architect and teacher.

Career
Fischer planned public housing projects for the city of Munich beginning in 1893.  He was the joint founder and first chairman of the Deutscher Werkbund (German work federation, 1907), as well as member of the German version of the Garden city movement.  In 1909 Fischer accepted a position as professor for architecture at the Technical University of Munich.

Notable pupils
Famous pupils of Fischer include Paul Bonatz, Hugo Häring, Ernst May, Erich Mendelsohn, JJP Oud, Bruno Taut, German Bestelmeyer and Paul Schmitthenner.

Style
Originally an imitator of historical styles, he changed direction, seeking a style which was closer to German tradition; his rediscovery of the expressive qualities of stone influenced many of his pupils, and his search for a more genuinely volkisch style explains his nationalist utterances in the early part of the Third Reich.  Fischer described his own style as something between historicism and art nouveau.  He tried to always work in the local context, and the socio-cultural character of the region, with an eye toward the social effect of his plans.

Bibliography 
 (1988): Theodor Fischer: Architekt Und Staedtebauer, Wilhelm Ernst & Sohn Verlag fur Architektur und technische Wissenschaften (German edition) 
Falko Lehmann (1988): Friedrich Theodor Fischer, 1803-1867: Architekt im Grossherzogtum Baden (Studien zur Bauforschung), Geiger-Verlag (German edition)

External links

19th-century German architects
1862 births
1938 deaths
People from Schweinfurt
Technical University of Munich alumni
Academic staff of the Technical University of Munich
Art Nouveau architects
20th-century German architects
Bavarian architects